Leonardville is the name of the following settlements:

 Leonardville, Kansas
 Leonardville, a community on Deer Island in New Brunswick
 Leonardville, New Jersey
 Leonardville, Namibia